Melinda L. Estes is president and CEO of Saint Luke's Health System, based in the bi-state Kansas City-metro area. Estes is a board-certified neurologist and neuropathologist. Prior to joining Saint Luke's Health System in September 2011, she served as president and CEO of Fletcher Allen Health Care, based in Burlington, Vermont since October 2003.

Education

Estes graduated from high school in Victoria, Texas. She holds a Bachelor of Science degree from Sam Houston State University in Huntsville, Texas, and earned her medical degree in 1978 from University of Texas Medical Branch in Galveston, Texas. While there, she also completed a neurology residency in 1982. Estes was a neuropathology fellow at Cleveland Clinic Foundation, from 1982 to 1984, and completed special training in pediatric neuropathology at the Children's Hospital of Philadelphia in 1984. She received a Master of Business Administration from Case Western Reserve University’s Weatherhead School of Management in 1995.

Career

Estes served as Associate Chief of Staff of Cleveland Clinic Foundation from 1990 to 1997. In that role, she managed human resource issues for more than 700 group-practice physicians. In 1990, she became the first woman to be elected to The Cleveland Clinic's board of governors, the nine-member executive management group of the Clinic responsible for establishing the future direction of the Clinic. Estes also served as head of neuropathology at the Cleveland Clinic Foundation. Her research resulted in more than 100 scientific papers published.  (Source)

In 1997 Estes left Cleveland Clinic Foundation to serve as executive vice president and chief of staff at MetroHealth System (MHS) in Cleveland from 1997 to 2000. In that role, she was responsible for all operational and financial management, strategic planning and hospital management of MHS.

In October 2000, Estes returned the Cleveland Clinic Foundation as executive director of business development. She also served as chief medical officer of Cleveland Clinic Florida from 2000 to 2001. From 2001 to September 2003, she served as chief executive officer and chairperson of governors of Cleveland Clinic Florida, where she oversaw both Cleveland Clinic Naples and Cleveland Clinic Weston.

Estes moved to Burlington, Vermont in 2003 to assume the role of president and CEO of Fletcher Allen Health Care. In September 2011, she was named president and CEO of Saint Luke's Health System.

Professional accomplishments 
On July 25, 2018, American Hospital Association (AHA) President and CEO Rick Pollack announced Dr. Estes as the new chair-elect designate for the AHA board of trustees. A member of the board since 2015, Estes currently serves on its executive committee, where she led an effort to strengthen physician engagement in the association and serves on an advisory group focused on how the association engages its members. Estes will serve a three-year term from 2019 to 2021, during which she will serve as chair-elect, chair, and immediate past chair.

Previously, Estes served on the board of the Council of Teaching Hospitals of the Association of American Medical Colleges, the board of directors of the University Health System Consortium, the American Hospital Association's Metropolitan Health Council, the Committee on Health Professionals, and the Regional Policy Board. She was chair of the board of the Vermont Associations of Hospitals and Health Systems and is a member of the Missouri Hospital Association.

References

External links
Saint Luke's Health System: About, Melinda L. Estes, MD, President and CEO

Year of birth missing (living people)
Living people
American women chief executives
American pathologists
Sam Houston State University alumni
Case Western Reserve University alumni
American women scientists
American women business executives
American health care chief executives